The Mystic River Historic District encompasses the part of the village of Mystic, Connecticut that is on the Groton side of the Mystic River. The district was added to the National Register of Historic Places on August 24, 1979, approximately  that includes much of the village now known as West Mystic and many buildings from the 19th century.

The historic district includes properties along Route 1, West Mystic Avenue, Route 215, High Street, Pearl Street, and Cliff Street. Mystic Pizza is located in the district, made famous by the movie of the same name.

According to the 1979 National Register nomination, the importance of the district is derived "from the completeness of the 19th-century community here preserved.  Seldom are houses, public buildings, stores, and factories of a 19th century town all in place, in good condition, and still in use, as they are in Mystic. The variety of architectural styles that the prosperous seafaring citizens employed in building up their community provide fine examples of the ongoing, 19th-century development of taste and design."

The district's boundaries are similar to those of a local historic district that was designated in 1974, but it includes some more modern structures than were included in the local designation, and its boundary lines are less irregular. It includes the former train depot of West Mystic.

In 1978, the district included about 470 sites and structures, of which 265 were houses built in Greek Revival, Italianate, or Queen Anne architectural styles that were popular during the 19th century.  Two historic sites in the district are:
 site of Fort Rachel where a single 12-pounder cannon repulsed British attack on Mystic in 1814
 site of the Mystic massacre of Pequot Indians in 1637, location not precisely known

See also
 Pequot Fort, located just north of the district
 Mystic Bridge Historic District, encompassing the historic part of Mystic village in Stonington
 National Register of Historic Places listings in New London County, Connecticut

Pictures of Mystic River Historic District

References

Groton, Connecticut
Villages in Connecticut
Historic districts in New London County, Connecticut
National Register of Historic Places in New London County, Connecticut
Historic districts on the National Register of Historic Places in Connecticut